Songkhla, also known as Singgora or Singora (Pattani Malay: ซิงกอรอ, Singoro), is a city (thesaban nakhon) in Songkhla Province of southern Thailand, near the border with Malaysia.

Despite being smaller than the neighboring city Hat Yai, Songkhla is the capital of Songkhla Province as well as the Mueang Songkhla District (Songkhla town district). Together with Hat Yai, Songkhla is part of the Greater Hat Yai-Songkhla Metropolitan Area (a conurbation with a population of around 800,000), the third largest metropolitan area in Thailand.

At the opening of Songkhla Lake to the Gulf of Thailand, Songkhla is a fishing town and also an important harbour. It is the major seaport on the east side of the Isthmus of Kra.

History

The name Songkhla is the Thai variant of "Singgora" (Jawi: سيڠڬورا); its original name means 'the city of lions' in Malay (not to be confused with Singapura). This refers to a lion-shaped mountain near the city of Songkhla. Archaeological excavations on the isthmus between Lake Songkhla and the sea reveal that in the 10th through the 14th century, this was a major urbanized area, and a center of international maritime trade, in particular with Quanzhou in China. The long Sanskrit name of the state that existed there has been lost; its short Sanskrit name was Singhapura ('Lion City') (not to be confused with Singapura), a city state. The short vernacular name was Satingpra, coming from the Mon-Khmer sting/steng/stang (meaning 'river') and the Sanskrit pura ('city').

The ruins of the ancient port city of Satingpra are just few kilometers north of Songkhla. It was one of the most important trading centers of the Tambralinga Kingdom. Archaeological digs and investigations conducted toward the end of the 20th century testify the existence of a fortified citadel protected by a moat and a quadrangular surrounding wall made of brick. A sophisticated system of canals connected the sea to the Songkhla Lake permitting the circulations of ships. The excavations brought to light artifacts of great historical and artistic value.

On 8 December 1941 local time, the Imperial Japanese army landed in Songkhla, invading Thailand. Because of the International Date Line, this actually occurred hours before the 7 December (Hawaii time) attack on Pearl Harbor, making it the first major action of the Pacific War. The Japanese forces then moved south towards Perlis and Penang as part of the Malayan campaign which culminated in the capture of Singapore.

Since 2003, Songhkla has been affected by separatist insurgencies in neighboring Narathiwat, Pattani, and Yala.

The municipality's mayor, Peera Tantiserane, was murdered in Songkhla in 2012.

Climate
Songkhla has a tropical monsoon climate (Köppen climate classification Am). Temperatures are very warm to hot throughout the year with only minor variation. There is a short dry season in February and March; the rest of the year is wet, with especially heavy rainfall from October to December.

Population
The majority of the population is Buddhist with a large proportion of Muslims, especially in the rural areas near the Malaysian border. These Muslims speak the Yawi language, a language closely related to Malay, which has some Thai influence, especially in loan words borrowed from the Thai language.

Songkhla's district has five administrative organizations (องค์การบริหารส่วนตำบล). Songkhla takes up the entire Bo Yang district.

Gallery

See also
Sultanate of Singgora
Mahavajiravudh Songkhla School

References

External links

 

 
Populated places in Songkhla province
Cities and towns in Thailand